Maxence Charles Layet (born 1 April 1971) is a French science and technology journalist and author.

Biography 

Maxence Layet attended the Aix-Marseille University where he studied sociology. From 1998 to 2001 he was an editor at a video-games website, gamelog.fr, then he contributed as free lancer at the French magazine Casus Belli. He was consultant at France Télécom. He has been investigating futurology about virtual worlds, cybernetics, greentech, electromagnetics warfare, bioelectromagnetism, environmental health and pollutions.
In 2010, his book Electrocultures and free energies ( Électrocultures et énergies libres), explores the electric and magnetic fields influences on plants.

Bibliography 
  2006, The secret energy of Universe
  2007, Futur 2.0
  2008, Quinton, serum of life.
  2009, Survive to mobile phone and wifi networks in the edition Le courrier du livre of Guy Trédaniel in March 2009.
  2010, Électrocultures et énergies libres, Maxence Layet & Roland Wehrlen, Le courrier du Livre, July 2010.

Filmography 
  Du quinton contre la hernie discale, Jean-Yves Bilien, BigBangBoum Film, 2008.
 Surrounded by the waves, Mosaïque Productions/Arte, 2009.
  Sous le feu des ondes, Mosaïque Productions/Arte, 2009.
 Casualties of waves, Jean-Yves Bilien, BigBangBoum Film, 2012.
  Les sacrifiés des ondes, Jean-Yves Bilien, BigBangBoum Film, 2012.

Footnotes

External links

 Amboise website
 Maxence Layet Arte Blog on Surrounded by the waves
 Casualties of waves trailer

Living people
1971 births
French male non-fiction writers